Kraussaria is a genus of grasshoppers in the subfamily Cyrtacanthacridinae with species found in Africa.

Species 
The following species are recognised in the genus Kraussaria:
 Kraussaria angulifera (Krauss, 1877)
 Kraussaria corallinipes (Karsch, 1896)
 Kraussaria deckeni Kevan, 1955
 Kraussaria dius (Karsch, 1896)
 Kraussaria prasina (Walker, 1870)

References 

Acrididae
Taxa named by Boris Uvarov